Melody Club is a 1949 British comedy musical film directed by Robert S. Baker and Monty Berman and starring Terry-Thomas, Gwynneth Vaughan and Michael Balfour. It was made at Kensington Studios.

Cast
 Terry-Thomas as Freddy Forrester  
 Gwynneth Vaughan as Jean  
 Michael Balfour as Max Calypso  
 Len Lowe as Tony  
 Bill Lowe as Birdie  
 Lilian Grey as Cora  
 Arthur Gomez as Inspector Dodds  
 Anthony Shaw as General Blitzem  
 Sylvia Clarke as Susie  
 Jack Mayne as Hector  
 Ida Patlanski as Hector's Wife

References

Bibliography
 Chibnall, Steve & McFarlane, Brian. The British 'B' Film. Palgrave MacMillan, 2009.

External links

1949 films
British musical comedy films
1949 musical comedy films
Films set in England
Films shot at Kensington Studios
British black-and-white films
Films directed by Monty Berman
Films directed by Robert S. Baker
1940s English-language films
1940s British films